Beli Breg may refer to:

 Beli Breg (Aleksinac), a village in the Aleksinac municipality of Nišava District, Serbia
 Beli Breg (Vranje), a village in the Vranje municipality of Pčinja District, Serbia
 Beli Breg, Bulgaria, a village in the Boychinovtsi Municipality, Bulgaria
 Beli Breg, Krško, a former village in the Municipality of Krško, Slovenia